The 1946 Italian local elections were the first after the fall of fascism in Italy, leading to the re-establishment of all municipal administrations, after the municipalities had been run by mayors and temporary councils appointed by the AMGOT in the South and by the CLN in the North.

The first turn of municipal elections was held on 10 March (436 municipalities), 17 March (1,033 municipalities), 24 March (1,469 municipalities), 31 March (1,560 municipalities) and 7 April (1,139 municipalities). The second turn of elections was held on 6 October (272 municipalities), 13 October, 20 October (286 municipalities), 27 October (188 municipalities), 3 November, 10 November, 17 November and 24 November.

The municipal elections of March 10 were the first to which women could also participate.

Results of the first turn of elections

Municipal elections of 10 March
Results summary of 434 municipalities.

Municipal elections of 17 March
Results summary of 1,008 municipalities.

Municipal elections of 24 March
Results summary of 1,459 municipalities.

In 7 municipalities there was no prevalence of any party.

Municipal elections of 31 March
Results summary of 1,505 municipalities.

Municipal elections of 7 April
Results summary of 1,141 municipalities.

In 5 municipalities there was no prevalence of any party.

Results of the second turn of elections

References

1946 elections in Italy
 
Municipal elections in Italy
March 1946 events in Europe
April 1946 events in Europe